The Murder of General Gryaznov (Georgian:Arsena Jorjiashvili) is a 1921 Georgian silent film directed by Ivane Perestiani. It is set during the 1905 uprising in Georgia.

Cast

References

Bibliography 
 Georges Sadoul & Peter Morris. Dictionary of Film Makers. University of California Press, 1972.

External links 
 

1921 films
Drama films from Georgia (country)
Silent films from Georgia (country)
Georgian-language films
Films set in Georgia (country)
Films set in 1905
Films about the 1905 Russian Revolution
Silent drama films